Kallupurackal Thomas Thomas (born 30 January 1937) is an Indian former judge who served on the Supreme Court of India and is known for his strong opinions on Indian socio-political matters. He was awarded the Padma Bhushan by the Indian government in 2007 for services in the field of social affairs.

Biography
K. T. Thomas was born in Kottayam district on 30 January 1937. After schooling at Baker Memorial School, he completed his Pre-University course from CMS College Kottayam and B.A. at St. Albert's College, Ernakulam where he served as the College Union Chairman. He studied law at Madras Law College. He enrolled as an advocate in 1960 and started his career in Kottayam as a junior advocate to Joseph Maliakal, a leading lawyer of those days. Soon, he set up his private practice at District Court, Kottayam and later, at the High Court of Kerala. In 1977, he was directly selected as District and Sessions Judge, securing first rank in the selection tests. He was promoted as a Judge of the High Court of Kerala in 1985 and served as the Acting Chief Justice in 1995. In 1996, he was appointed as a Judge of the Supreme Court of India. During his practice as an advocate, he led an Indian delegation to attend the World Conference on Peace held at Texas, USA in 1976. He also served as Chairman of one of the Commissions set up in the World Conference.

Thomas retired from service in 2002 and lives at Muttambalam in Kottayam district. His autobiography, Honeybees of Solomon, published in 2008, is an account of his judicial service of 25 years, which has since been published in Malayalam in the name Solomontae Theneechakal.
His son, Justice Bechu Kurien, who was one of the youngest to be a designated Senior Advocate of the Kerala High Court was sworn in as an Additional Judge of the Kerala High Court in March 2020.

Notable judgement
Justice Thomas presided over the Supreme Court bench that confirmed the death sentence in the Rajiv Gandhi assassination case.

Political positions
Justice Thomas is very vocal in expressing his views.

His recommendations on the fee structure for professional education in Kerala at unaided institutions also drew opposition from the institution owners.

In August 2011, he made a public speech where he exonerated RSS from the assassination of Mahatma Gandhi which generated heated public debate.

His opposition to the Communal and Targeted Violence bill also created a stir. He termed the Bill to be divisive and against the constitution of India.

Though Justice Thomas wrote a dissenting note on the report of the Empowered Committee regarding the maintenance of the water level at Mullaperiyar dam, his concurrence with the report stating that the dam was safe raised criticism in his home state of Kerala.

In the Rajiv Gandhi assassination case, he opined in 2013 that the three accused sentenced to death should be spared from capital punishment due to the delay of 23 years in carrying out the punishment.

In March 2014, Thomas declined the offer of the Government of India to head the selection committee of Lokpal stating the "recommendations of the search committee are not binding on the selection committee. Therefore, the work of the search committee can as well be done by the selection committee itself." Another matter of public interest was his letter to the Chief Justice of India on allegations raised by Senior Advocate Dushyant Dave regarding the disposal of a 12-year-old land allotment case by a two-judge bench headed by Justice C.K. Prasad, which was actually listed before another three Judge Bench.

Awards
 Padma Bhushan Award by Government of India, 2007.

Positions held
 District and Sessions Judge, Kottayam – 1977
 Additional District and Sessions Judge, Calicut – 1979
 Principal District and Sessions Judge, Calicut – 1981
 Additional Justice, High Court of Kerala – 1985
 Permanent Justice, High Court of Kerala – 1986
 Acting Chief Justice, High Court of Kerala – 1995
 Justice, Supreme Court of India – 1996
 Chairman – Justice K. T. Thomas Committee on Unaided professional colleges – 2003
 Chairman of the Police Reforms Monitoring Committee constituted by the Supreme Court
 Chairman of the School Review Commission to review the functioning of National Law School of India University, Bangalore
Mukhyarakshaadhikaary of Sevabharathy(A part of RSS) KOTTAYAM.

References

External links
 News on Padma bhushan award
 Profile on the Supreme Court of India web site
 on Parliament's use of amending powers
 Justice K T Thomas Committee
 Opinion on Death penalty
 on Rajiv Gandhi assassination case
 Letter to Prime Minister on Lokpal
 
 Final Report – People's Police Movement

Further reading
 
 

1937 births
Living people
Indian Christians
Saint Thomas Christians
Judges of the Kerala High Court
Recipients of the Padma Bhushan in public affairs
20th-century Indian lawyers
20th-century Indian educational theorists
Scientists from Kottayam
20th-century Indian judges
CMS College Kottayam alumni
Justices of the Supreme Court of India
Assassination of Rajiv Gandhi